Fedor Iwan den Hertog (20 April 194612 February 2011) was a Dutch racing cyclist. His sporting career began with De Ijsselstreek Wezep. He won the Olympic 100 km team time trial in 1968 with Joop Zoetemelk, René Pijnen and Jan Krekels. He also won the national road championship in 1977.

Biography
Hertog was born to a Dutch father and Russian mother. As an amateur, he won the British Milk Race in 1969 and 1971. His most outstanding performance was the Rheinland-Pfalz tour in Germany in 1969, when he won nine of 11 stages and overall, 36 minutes ahead of the field. He was national road champion in 1968 and pursuit champion in 1968 and 1971. He came third in the Olympic team time trial in 1972, but the team was disqualified for a doping offense. In 1969 and 1970, Hertog won the Grand Prix des Nations, and in 1969 won the Tour of Belgium. An accident with a car in the Belgian Ardennes on 17 August 1967 came close to ending his career. Den Hertog was considered the best amateur of his time, and many professional teams wanted him, but he declined out of fear to lose his freedom.

In 1974, Den Hertog finally turned professional but he had passed his peak. He first rode the Tour de France in 1974. He rode three times for the Dutch team, Frisol, coming 27th, 18th and then not finishing, although in 1977 he won the stage to Rouen. He broke away from the field 21 km from the finish and won by 20 seconds. He dropped out with knee pain in the 13th stage. He also rode for Lejeune-BP and the Belgian team, IJsboerke-Warncke Eis, but never with the success he had as an amateur.

He won a stage in the Vuelta à España in 1977 but retired soon afterwards. He opened a bicycle business in Dilsen in Belgium but closed it for "personal circumstances". In 2007, he was diagnosed with prostate cancer, from which he died in February 2011.

His brother, Nidi, was a professional cyclist from 1974 to 1980.

Major results

1966
 National Militaries Road Championship
1968
 National Amateur Track Pursuit Championship
 Olympic Games Team Time Trial (with Jan Krekels, René Pijnen and Joop Zoetemelk)
1969
Milk Race
Rheinland-Pfalz Rundfahrt
1970
Omloop der Kempen
Ronde van Limburg
1971
Milk Race
 National Amateur Track Pursuit Championship
1972
Tour de l'Avenir
1973
Olympia's Tour
1976
Ronde van Midden-Zeeland
1977
Liedekerkse Pijl
 Dutch National Road Race Championship
Schijndel
Trofee Jan van Erp
Tour de France:
Winner stage 10
Vuelta a España:
Winner stage 3
1979
GP Frans Verbeeck
1980
Maaslandse Pijl

See also
 List of Dutch Olympic cyclists

References

External links 

Official Tour de France results for Fedor den Hertog

1946 births
2011 deaths
Olympic gold medalists for the Netherlands
Dutch male cyclists
Olympic cyclists of the Netherlands
Cyclists at the 1968 Summer Olympics
Cyclists at the 1972 Summer Olympics
Sportspeople from Utrecht (city)
Dutch Tour de France stage winners
Dutch Vuelta a España stage winners
Deaths from prostate cancer
Olympic medalists in cycling
Competitors stripped of Summer Olympics medals
Medalists at the 1968 Summer Olympics
UCI Road World Championships cyclists for the Netherlands
Cyclists from Utrecht (province)
20th-century Dutch people